Richard Charles Lange Sr. (June 3, 1921 – February 9, 2012) was an American professional basketball player. He played for the Oshkosh All-Stars in the National Basketball League for four games during the 1945–46 season and averaged 0.5 points per game.

References

External links
 University of Wisconsin–Whitewater Hall of Fame profile

1921 births
2012 deaths
American men's basketball players
United States Army Air Forces personnel of World War II
Basketball players from Wisconsin
Forwards (basketball)
Military personnel from Wisconsin
Oshkosh All-Stars players
People from Mayville, Wisconsin
Wisconsin–Whitewater Warhawks football players
Wisconsin–Whitewater Warhawks men's basketball players